Sir Hender Molesworth, 1st Baronet (ca. 1638 – 27 July 1689), was made 1st Baronet of Pencarrow after serving as acting Governor of Jamaica from 1684 to 1687 and from 1688 to 1689.

References

External links

 

1689 deaths
Governors of Jamaica
Year of birth uncertain
Baronets in the Baronetage of England
17th-century Jamaican people